The 183rd Paratroopers Regiment "Nembo" is an active unit of the Italian Army based in Pistoia in Tuscany. The regiment is part of the Italian Army's infantry arm's Paracadutisti speciality and assigned to the Paratroopers Brigade "Folgore".

The regiment was the fifth Italian paratroopers regiment to be formed. The regiment was assigned to the 184th Paratroopers Division "Nembo", with which the regiment deployed to Sardinia. After the announcement of the Armistice of Cassibile on 8 September 1943 the regiment joined the Italian Co-belligerent Army and fought against the Germans in the Italian campaign. In September 1944 the remnants of the regiment and of its sister regiment the 184th Infantry Regiment "Nembo" were merged to form the Paratroopers Regiment "Nembo", which continued to serve on the allied side for the rest of the war. In 1948 the Paratroopers Regiment "Nembo" was renamed 183rd Infantry Regiment "Nembo", which was based in the Friuli region. In 1975 the regiment was reduced to a battalion sized mechanized unit, which was disbanded on 1 May 1991. At the end of the same month the regiment was reformed as a paratroopers battalion in Tuscany. In 1993 the regiment was reformed.

History

Formation 
On 1 February 1943 the 183rd Infantry Regiment "Nembo" was formed at the Royal Italian Air Force Paratroopers School Tarquinia. The regiment consisted of a command, the VIII/bis, XV, and XVI paratrooper battalions, and the 183rd Cannons Company, which was equipped with 47/32 anti-tank guns. The regiment moved from Tarquinia to Florence, where it was assigned to the 184th Infantry Division "Nembo".

In May 1943 the regiment exchanged the VIII/bis Paratroopers Battalion with the X/bis Paratroopers Battalion of the 185th Infantry Regiment "Nembo". In June of the same year the division was transferred to Sardinia.

World War II 

In early June 1943 the 184th Infantry Division "Nembo" was transferred to Sardinia and assigned to XIII Army Corps, which was responsible for the defense of the southern half of the island. The division was divided into three tactical groups, which were dispersed in the island's south-western region of Campidano. The tactical groups were intended to act as rapid reinforcements for the coastal units garrisoning the beaches, where allied forces were expected to land.

On 8 September 1943 the Armistice of Cassibile was announced and the 183rd Infantry Regiment "Nembo" remained loyal to King Victor Emmanuel III and joined the Italian Co-belligerent Army. On order of the division's commander the X/bis Paratroopers Battalion of the 183rd Infantry Regiment "Nembo" was disbanded as its personnel was deemed unreliable.

In May 1944 the division was transferred to mainland Italy and joined the Italian Co-belligerent Army's Italian Liberation Corps. On 22 May 1944 the 184th Infantry Regiment "Nembo" entered combat followed by the rest of the division on 31 May. For the Battle of Ancona in July 1944 the Italian Liberation Corps was assigned to the Polish II Corps. In this battle the division distinguished itself in the liberation of Filottrano, earning the 183rd Infantry Regiment "Nembo" a Bronze Medal of Military Valor and the 184th Infantry Regiment "Nembo" a War Cross of Military Valor.

On 24 September 1944 the division, its two infantry regiments, and most of the division support units were disbanded and the personnel used to form the Paratroopers Regiment "Nembo" and support units for the newly formed Combat Group "Folgore". The combat group consisted of the Paratroopers Regiment "Nembo", the Royal Italian Navy's Marine Regiment "San Marco", the Paratroopers Artillery Regiment "Folgore", and the CLXXXIV Mixed Engineer Battalion. Both regiments consisted of a command, three infantry battalions, a mortar company equipped with British ML 3 inch mortars, and an anti-tank company equipped with British QF 6 pounder guns. Dressed in British uniforms the combat group was assigned to the British XIII Corps, with which it fought in the Italian Campaign.

In March 1945 the combat group fought at Tossignano and on 19 April 1945 the II Battalion of the Paratroopers Regiment "Nembo" fought a heavy battle against the Fallschirmjäger of the German 1. Fallschirmjäger-Division at Case Grizzano. The paratroopers of the Nembo expelled the Germans from their positions at Case Grizzano and then defeated five German counterattacks, which opened the way for the allied armies to liberate Bologna. During the battle the commander of the battalion, Lieutenant Colonel Giuseppe Izzo, was gravely injured and when he was transported to the rear he was immediately awarded the American Distinguished Service Cross, making him the only Italian recipient of the award in all of World War II. Shortly afterwards Lieutenant Colonel Giuseppe Izzo was also awarded Italy's highest military honor the Gold Medal of Military Valour.

On 20 April 1945 the paratroopers of the 1st Reconnaissance Squadron "Folgore" (Squadron "F"), which had been formed from the 9th Company/ III Paratroopers Battalion of the 185th Infantry Regiment "Nembo" and had been reinforced twice with paratroopers of the Paratroopers Regiment "Nembo", jumped during Operation Herring in the war's final airborne combat drop, into the area of Poggio Rusco. For its conduct at Tossignano, Case Grizzano, and Poggio Rusco the Paratroopers Regiment "Nembo" was awarded a Silver Medal of Military Valour after the war's end.

Cold War 

After the war's end the Paratroopers Regiment "Nembo" remained assigned to the Combat Group "Folgore", which on 15 October 1945 was renamed Infantry Division "Folgore". Initially the regiment was based in Arezzo, but in 1946 it moved to Pistoia, and in 1947 to Belluno. On 1 December 1948 the Paratroopers Regiment "Nembo" was renamed 183rd Infantry Regiment "Nembo" and consisted of the following units:

 183rd Infantry Regiment "Nembo", in Belluno
 Command, and Command Company
 I Battalion
 II Battalion
 III Battalion
 Mortar Company (with 81mm Mod. 35 mortars)
 Anti-tank Cannons Company (with QF 6-pounder anti-tank guns)

In 1953 the regiment moved from Belluno to Cervignano del Friuli. In 1963 the regiment was sent to Longarone to help rescue efforts after the Vajont dam disaster. For its conduct in Longarone the regiment was awarded a Silver Medal of Civil Valour.

During the 1975 army reform the Italian Army disbanded the regimental level and newly independent battalions were granted for the first time their own flags. On 20 October 1975 the 183rd Infantry Regiment "Nembo" and three of its four battalions were disbanded. The next day the regiment's IV Mechanized Battalion in Gradisca d'Isonzo was renamed 183rd Mechanized Infantry Battalion "Nembo" and assigned the flag and traditions of the 183rd Infantry Regiment "Nembo". The battalion was assigned to the Mechanized Brigade "Gorizia" and consisted of a command, a command and services company, three mechanized companies with M113 armored personnel carriers, and a heavy mortar company with M106 mortar carriers with 120mm Mod. 63 mortars.

For its conduct and work after the 1976 Friuli earthquake the battalion was awarded a Bronze Medal of Army Valour, which was affixed to the battalion's flag and added to the battalion's coat of arms.

Recent times 
On 1 May 1991 the 183rd Mechanized Infantry Battalion "Nembo" was disbanded and the flag of the 183rd Infantry Regiment "Nembo" was transferred to Pistoia, where on 31 May 1991 the 183rd Paratroopers Battalion "Nembo" was formed. The battalion received the flag and traditions of the 183rd Infantry Regiment "Nembo" and was assigned to the Paratroopers Brigade "Folgore".

On 22 April 1993 the 183rd Paratroopers Battalion "Nembo" lost its autonomy and the next day the battalion entered the reformed 183rd Paratroopers Regiment "Nembo" as I Paratroopers Battalion "Grizzano".

From 21 May to 7 September 1993 the regiment was deployed to Somalia for the American-led Unified Task Force. After the regiment's return to Italy it was awarded a Silver Medal of Army Valour for its conduct in Somalia.

From 3 April to 20 October 2009 the regiment was deployed to Afghanistan for the NATO-led International Security Assistance Force. After the regiment's return to Italy it was awarded a Bronze Medal of Army Valour for its conduct in Afghanistan.

Current structure 
As of 2023 the 183rd Paratroopers Regiment "Nembo" consists of:

  Regimental Command, in Pistoia
 Command and Logistic Support Company "Orsi"
 1st Paratroopers Battalion "Grizzano"
 12th Paratroopers Maneuver Support Company "Leopardi"
 18th Paratroopers Company "Leoni"
 19th Paratroopers Company "Linci"
 20th Paratroopers Company "Puma"

The Command and Logistic Support Company fields the following platoons: C3 Platoon, Transport and Materiel Platoon, Medical Platoon, and Commissariat Platoon. The regiment is equipped with VTLM Lince vehicles. The 12th Paratroopers Maneuver Support Company is equipped with 120mm mortars and Spike MR anti-tank guided missiles.

See also 
 Paratroopers Brigade "Folgore"

External links
 Italian Army Website: 183rd Paratroopers Regiment "Nembo"

References

Paracadutisti Regiments of Italy